The Oley Hills site, or Oley Hills stone work site, located in Berks County, Pennsylvania, is an enigmatic complex of snaking dry stone walls, carefully shaped rock piles or cairns, perched boulders, and unusually shaped natural boulders. It is possible to see animal and human forms in some of the rock piles and boulders, but whether those images were intended by the builders or are phenomena of the imaginations of modern observers has not been demonstrated. The site boasts other features such as an enormous "split-wedged boulder," a split boulder with another stone wedged into the split.

A luminescence analysis of the site suggests the cairns were erected around 570 BC, possibly by the Adena culture, which was centered in the Ohio River Valley. Muller argued instead that the site was the product of Native American ceremonial practices. It may be an example of the ceremonial stone landscapes described by USET, United Southern and Eastern Tribes, Inc. in their resolution on the topic.

References

External links
Accenting the Landscape: Interpreting the Oley Hills Site
Terraced Boulder Site, Oley Hills, Pennsylvania
Row-Linked Boulder Site, Oley Hills, Pennsylvania

Earth mysteries
Archaeological sites in Pennsylvania
Native American history of Pennsylvania